Eastonville was a town in eastern Colorado from c. 1880-1935.  It is no longer incorporated.  The former town limits now reside in El Paso County, in the Colorado Springs metro area, near Black Forest.

The area around Eastonville began settlement around 1872 when a post office was established a mile to the south of its eventual location on Squirrel Creek. The area was located in the Black Forest of Colorado and was found to be suitable for potato farming and many pioneers homesteaded in the vicinity. In 1881 the Denver and New Orleans Railroad (later the Colorado and Southern Railway) laid their tracks through the area and created a stop named "McConnellsville" near what is now Eastonville; this was the main standard gauge line from Colorado Springs to Denver until the 3-foot-gauge Denver and Rio Grande was 3-railed.  Shortly after, in 1883, the area post office was moved north and named "Easton" for a local pioneer, John Easton.  The town soon became Eastonville.  At the behest of the railroad, the town moved a short distance to its current site.

By the 1900s the town had 350-500 people. It had three churches, three hotels, a newspaper, a school house, race track, ball field, and many businesses. Nine to ten passenger trains passed through everyday, and with at least that many freight trains using the tracks a constant rolling of locomotives could be heard day and night in the burgeoning city. It had become the self-proclaimed "potato capital of the world" and some years couldn't find enough workers to harvest the crops. Colorado Springs newspapers would print large advertisements offering work at respectable wages on the potato farms of Eastonville.  It was one of the most prosperous farm centers in eastern Colorado that are now ghost towns.

Eastonville continued as a stable town until the 1930s when drought and depression hit the west. In 1935 the area endured a potato blight and a flood which washed away many buildings in Elbert, the next town north on the railroad; the railroad was then abandoned. The town couldn't recover without the railroad, especially since Peyton (6 miles away) still had the Rock Island railroad. Although little remains but a few buildings and the cemetery, as of May 2013 the United States Board on Geographic Names still lists Eastonville as a populated place.

As the town died, the Eastonville school district was merged into the Peyton School District 23jt.  Eastonville is, however, in the Falcon fire district.

See also
 List of ghost towns in Colorado

References

Former populated places in El Paso County, Colorado
Former populated places in Colorado